Munbae-dong is a dong, neighbourhood of Yongsan-gu in Seoul, South Korea. It is a legal dong (법정동 ) administered under its administrative dong (행정동 ), Hangangno 1-dong

Orion Confectionery has its headquarters in Munbae-dong.

See also 
Administrative divisions of South Korea

References

External links
 Yongsan-gu official website
 Yongsan-gu official website

Neighbourhoods of Yongsan District